Thomas Charles Hanbury-Tracy, 2nd Baron Sudeley (5 February 1801 – 19 February 1863), known as Thomas Leigh between 1806 and 1838 and styled The Honourable Thomas Leigh between 1838 and 1839 and The Honourable Thomas Hanbury-Tracy between 1839 and 1858, was a British colliery owner and politician.

Hanbury-Tracy was the son of Charles Hanbury-Tracy, 1st Baron Sudeley, and the Honourable Henrietta Susanna Tracy, daughter of Henry Tracy, 8th Viscount Tracy. The Hanbury family derived its wealth from its ownership of the Pontypool Ironworks. In 1806 he assumed by Royal licence the surname of Leigh in lieu of his patronymic. However, in 1839 he discontinued the use of this surname and resumed by Royal licence his original surname of Hanbury-Tracy. He was returned to Parliament for Wallingford in 1831, a seat he held until 1832. On 10 February 1852, his father appointed him a deputy lieutenant of Montgomeryshire. He succeeded his father in the barony in 1858 and also succeeded him as Lord Lieutenant of Montgomeryshire, which he remained until his death five years later.

Lord Sudeley married Emma Elizabeth Alicia Pennant, daughter of George Hay Dawkins-Pennant, in 1831. 
 Sudeley Hanbury-Tracy, 3rd Baron Sudeley
 Charles Hanbury-Tracy, 4th Baron Sudeley
 Frederick Stephen Archibald Hanbury-Tracy sat as Member of Parliament for Montgomery.

Lord Sudeley died in February 1863, aged 62, and was succeeded in the barony by his son, Sudeley. Lady Sudeley died in July 1888.

References

External links

1801 births
1863 deaths
Barons in the Peerage of the United Kingdom
Eldest sons of British hereditary barons
Deputy Lieutenants of Montgomeryshire
Lord-Lieutenants of Montgomeryshire
Leigh, Thomas
Leigh, Thomas
Sudeley, B2
Hanbury-Tracy family